The Tennessee Volunteers Men's Basketball Team is the collegiate men's basketball program for the University of Tennessee–Knoxville. The Volunteers (commonly referred to as the "Vols") compete in Division I of the National Collegiate Athletic Association (NCAA) and the Southeastern Conference (SEC).
The Volunteers play their home games in Thompson–Boling Arena, on a court nicknamed "the Summitt", after former Tennessee Lady Vols basketball coach Pat Summitt. With a current capacity of 21,678 (formerly 24,535), Tennessee has consistently ranked in the top 15 in the nation in terms of volume of attendance, averaging 14,817 (60.39% capacity) attendance from 1988 through 2006, and averaging 17,194 (79.34% capacity) attendance from 2007 through 2018 after reducing seating capacity prior to the 2007 season. Historically, Tennessee ranks third in the SEC in all-time wins. Many notable players have played collegiately at Tennessee—players such as Bernard King, Dale Ellis, Allan Houston, Tobias Harris, and Grant Williams who all play(ed) in the NBA.

The Volunteers are currently coached by Rick Barnes, who was hired on March 31, 2015 to replace Donnie Tyndall.

History

Ray Mears era

Building the foundation: "This is Big Orange Country!"

In 1963, the University of Tennessee hired Ray Mears to become the head coach of the men's basketball program. The hiring of Mears, who was coming off an NCAA small college championship at Wittenberg University, ushered in the most sustained period of success in Tennessee men's basketball history.

In his first year, Mears's Volunteers improved from a 4–19 record in 1962 to 13–11, highlighted by two wins over the Kentucky Wildcats. Before Mears, Tennessee had only beaten the Wildcats twice in 39 meetings. Throughout his career, Mears gained notoriety throughout the SEC for frequently being a thorn in the powerhouse Kentucky's side. In an era where Kentucky was coached by future College Basketball Hall of Fame members Adolph Rupp and Joe B. Hall, winning 75% of their games, Mears recorded a 15–15 record against the Wildcats.

Led by A. W. Davis, the Volunteers finished second in the SEC in each of the next two seasons and recorded 20 wins in 1965, reaching that mark for the first time in 17 years. This success and the resultant growing fan support led to the university's decision to expand the 7,500-seat Amory-Fieldhouse to 12,700 seats. It was renamed Stokely Athletic Center to honor William B. Stokely, whose donation funded the renovation.

In the expanded Stokely Center's inaugural season, the Volunteers captured the 1967 SEC championship and made the program's first ever NCAA tournament appearance. Dubbed the "Fearless Five," the 1967 team won road games against top conference teams Florida, Kentucky, and Mississippi State. The win over Mississippi State, coming in double-overtime on a pair of Bill Justus free throws, secured Tennessee's first SEC championship in 24 years and is referred to by some as the greatest basketball game in Tennessee history.

From 1968 to 1973, Mears kept Tennessee among the top teams of the SEC, winning a second SEC championship in 1972 and finishing second in every year except 1970.

The Ernie and Bernie Show
In 1974, Mears and his trusted assistant Stu Aberdeen were able to recruit New York City standout forward Ernie Grunfeld to Knoxville. In his freshman season, Grunfeld led the team in scoring, averaging 17.4 points per game, and received first-team All-SEC honors.

The following season, Grunfeld was joined by fellow New Yorker Bernard King. Known as "The Ernie and Bernie Show," King and Grunfeld led the Volunteers to a 61–20 record over three years and an SEC championship in 1977. During their three years together, Tennessee posted a 5–1 record against Kentucky. The Volunteers reached the National Invitation Tournament in 1975 and the NCAA Tournament in 1976 and 1977. King was named first-team All-American and SEC Player of the Year in 1975 and 1976, and then shared the honor with Grunfeld in 1977, with both being named SEC Co-Player of the Year.

Grunfeld graduated from Tennessee in 1977 and King chose to forgo his senior year to enter the NBA draft. King was drafted 7th overall to the New Jersey Nets and Grunfeld went 11th overall to the Milwaukee Bucks. Both enjoyed long and illustrious NBA careers.

Perhaps the biggest impact of the "Ernie and Bernie" show was how it changed the national perception of the Tennessee basketball program. This "Double Trouble from Tennessee" was featured in the February 1976 edition of Sports Illustrated. In 2013, ESPN premiered a "30 for 30" documentary called "Bernie and Ernie" about the all-time great Volunteer basketball players.

Exit and legacy

Following the exit of his two biggest stars, Mears, who long struggled with depression, was not able to coach the team in 1978. Under the watch of interim coach Cliff Wettig, the Volunteers struggled to an 11–16 record, and Mears officially retired due to health reasons after the season.

Mears is remembered not only as the greatest coach in Tennessee men's basketball history, but also as a great entertainer and marketer. From the beginning of his time at Tennessee, Mears employed marketing tactics to get fans to games—from his patented and provocative orange blazer, to his introduction of the Pride of the Southland Band to basketball games, to his entertaining pre-game warmups that compared to the Harlem Globetrotters for creativity. At the beginning of his tenure, Mears declared, "This is Big Orange Country," and this slogan has lived on long past his coaching years.

Don DeVoe era

Don DeVoe was named Mears's successor and took over as head coach for the 1979 season. Despite the losing record in 1978, DeVoe inherited a roster centered on All-American center Reggie Johnson. DeVoe's 1979 Volunteers finished the regular season with a 21–12 record, beating Kentucky twice and earning a second-place finish in the SEC. The 1979 SEC tournament was the first held in 27 years, and the Volunteers reached the tournament finals, where they once again defeated Kentucky by a score of 75–69 to win their first SEC Tournament championship since 1943. With the tournament championship win, the Volunteers were invited back to the NCAA Tournament, where they recorded the program's first NCAA Tournament win with a defeat of Eastern Kentucky. Tennessee was eliminated in the second round with a loss to Notre Dame.

DeVoe led Tennessee to the NCAA Tournament each of the next five years, but none of his teams advanced past the second round. Through his first seven years at UT, DeVoe compiled an overall record of 143–79 (.644). The program's momentum under his direction eventually weakened, however, and the Volunteers were not invited to the NCAA Tournament or the NIT in 1986 or 1987.

Entering the 1989 season, DeVoe's 11th year at Tennessee, his teams had not reached the NCAA Tournament or finished above 6th in the SEC since 1983. DeVoe led the Volunteers to a 19–11 record and a berth in the NCAA Tournament. After an 84–68 loss to West Virginia in the first round, DeVoe resigned.

The growth of UT basketball under DeVoe is still seen today in the Vols' current home arena, Thompson–Boling Arena, which was built during his tenure. By the mid-1980s, the overflow crowds had grown too large for the 12,700-seat Stokley Athletic Center. In 1988, the Volunteers moved to the new $30 million Thompson-Boling Arena, which seated over 24,500 people–at the time, the largest facility ever built specifically for basketball in the United States. Sitting on the banks of the Tennessee River nearby historic Neyland Stadium, the arena has accommodated 21,678 people since a 2007 renovation.

Houston, O’Neill, Green, and Peterson

In 1990, Wade Houston, an Alcoa, Tennessee native and former assistant coach at Louisville, became the first African-American head coach in Tennessee and SEC history. Houston's son, Allan Houston, came to UT to play for his father and would become one of the most accomplished players in Tennessee history. With 2801 points, Allan Houston finished his career as Tennessee's all-time leading scorer and was named All-American in 1992 and 1993.

Houston was fired after a 5–22 campaign in 1994, finishing the worst season in Tennessee history. None of his teams reached the NCAA Tournament, and only two of his teams received invitations to the NIT, the two of which were also his only teams to finish with winning records. Houston finished with an overall record of 65–90 at Tennessee.

Houston was replaced by Kevin O'Neill in 1995. O’Neill—an intense and somewhat high-strung sideline coach, but also a skilled recruiter—took over a program depleted in talent. He was able to sign talented players such as Brandon Wharton, Tony Harris, and Isiah Victor. O’Neill left Tennessee to become the head coach at Northwestern after the 1997 season.

O’Neill was replaced by Oregon Ducks head coach Jerry Green. Green inherited a roster with significant young talent and was able to an immediate improvement in on-court success. His first Tennessee team produced a 20–9 overall record—a nine-win improvement over the 11–16 record of O'Neill's third and final UT team—and advanced to the 1998 NCAA tournament. In his second year, Green's Volunteers won the 1999 SEC East Division championship and defeated Kentucky twice in the same season for the first time since 1979, in what is generally regarded to be the best overall year in school athletics history. (The 1998 Tennessee Football team finished 13–0 and won the first-ever BCS National Championship. In women's basketball, Pat Summitt led the Lady Volunteers to a 39–0 NCAA championship season, the program's third consecutive national title.)

The 2000 Tennessee men's basketball team finished 26–7, repeating as SEC East champions, winning the Volunteers' first SEC championship since 1982, and setting a program record for most wins in a single season. In the NCAA Tournament, the Volunteers advanced to the first Sweet Sixteen in school history, where they lost a close contest to North Carolina.

Green's Volunteers began the 2001 season with a 16–1 record, rising to No. 4 in the AP Poll. Beginning with a ten-point loss at Kentucky in mid-January, Tennessee then struggled to a 22–11 finish. Green's team advanced to the NCAA Tournament—the fourth appearance in Green's four seasons—losing in the first round. Coupled with his multiple incidents with local media and Tennessee fans, this disappointing finish to the season led to Green's resignation.

He was replaced by Buzz Peterson, who failed to lead the program to an NCAA Tournament berth in his four years as head coach. He was fired after the 2005 season, in which his team finished 14–17.

Bruce Pearl era

Revival in Big Orange Country

After taking Wisconsin–Milwaukee to a Sweet Sixteen in 2005, Bruce Pearl was hired as the new Tennessee men's basketball coach. Pearl's assistants Tony Jones, Steve Forbes, Jacob Nichols, Jason Shay, and Ken Johnson were part of a staff that would help to lead the Volunteers to the NCAA tournament six years in a row.

2005–06

Pearl inherited a roster that had not experienced much winning, but showed promise with future NBA senior point guard C. J. Watson and All-SEC freshman team shooting guard Chris Lofton.

Pearl's coaching, which included playing an up-tempo style and pressing defense, led to immediate gains for Tennessee. In his first season, Pearl led the Volunteers to a 22–8 record, an SEC East Division championship, and a no. 2 seed in the NCAA Tournament. Pearl's first team achieved some of the more memorable wins in program history, including two wins against the eventual national champion Florida Gators. Another memorable win came when Chris Lofton, who is a Kentucky native, led the Volunteers over Kentucky in Rupp Arena for the program's first win there since 1999.

2006–07

Pearl's 2006 recruiting class was ranked among the top ten in college basketball. Despite the influx of freshmen and their inexperience, the Volunteers were able to open with a 13–2 start to the season. All-American guard Chris Lofton was injured and missed a good portion of January and early February, during which time the Volunteers opened 3–5 in SEC play. After Lofton returned, Tennessee won 7 out of their last 8 regular season games. Given a no. 5 seed, the Volunteers returned to the Sweet Sixteen where they faced no. 1 seed Ohio State. Tennessee led 49–32 at halftime, but the eventual NCAA runner-up Buckeyes mounted a comeback to defeat the Volunteers by a score of 85–84.

During the 2006–07 season, the Volunteers were ranked 4th nationally in attendance, with an average of 19,661 fans in Thompson–Boling Arena, which has a capacity of 21,758. This marked an increase in attendance of an average of 7,436 per game since Pearl arrived in March 2005.

2007–08

Preseason expectations for the Volunteers were high entering the 2008 season. Chris Lofton was a preseason pick by some to win National Player of the Year, and he was joined by Tyler Smith, an All-Big Ten freshman transfer from Iowa. Senior guards JaJuan Smith and Jordan Howell, along with rising sophomores Wayne Chism and Ramar Smith, propelled the Volunteers to a preseason no. 7 ranking.

The team posted a record of 28–3 in the regular season. The season was highlighted by the rivalry matchup between Tennessee and Memphis. John Calipari's Tigers were undefeated and ranked no. 1 and the Volunteers were no. 2. In front the largest TV audience to date to ever watch a game on ESPN, the two teams remained evenly matched for thirty-nine minutes. The Volunteers trailed 61–60 with 30 seconds left before Tyler Smith made a jump-shot to give UT the lead. The Volunteers added three free throws and took the contest by a score of 66–62. The following Monday, Tennessee was ranked no. 1 in polls for the first time in school history.

The Volunteers finished the regular season as the outright SEC champions and the no. 1 seed for the SEC Tournament in Atlanta. The Volunteers won their first game to set up a semifinal matchup against Arkansas in the Georgia Dome. The night before the game, an EF2 tornado hit Downtown Atlanta, damaging the Georgia Dome and much of the surrounding area. Because of this, the tournament was nearly canceled but was ultimately moved to Georgia Tech's Alexander Memorial Coliseum. The Razorbacks were able to upset the Volunteers, denying them a place in the final and a shot at their first SEC Tournament championship in 30 years.

The Volunteers received a no. 2 seed in the NCAA Tournament. They advanced to the Sweet Sixteen, where they lost to the Louisville Cardinals men's basketball. Despite the disappointing ending, the 2008 season is remembered as one of the best in program history.

2008–09

Replacing Chris Lofton proved a difficult task in the 2009 season. Now led by Tyler Smith, the Volunteers finished with a 21–13 record. However, Tennessee claimed another SEC division championship. The Volunteers advanced to the SEC Tournament Championship in Tampa before losing to Mississippi State 64–61. The Volunteers lost their NCAA Tournament first-round game to Oklahoma State.

2009–10

Entering the regular season ranked in the top 10, the Volunteers started the season 10–2. On New Year's Day, players Melvin Goins, Cam Tatum, Brian Williams, and leading scorer Tyler Smith were arrested after a traffic stop when police found marijuana and an illegal firearm. The players were all suspended for multiple games and Tyler Smith was eventually dismissed from the team.

After the suspensions, the Volunteers were left with only six scholarship players. The Volunteers defeated Charlotte and then hosted no. 1 Kansas the next game. In front of a sellout crowd, the undermanned Volunteers defeated the Jayhawks 76–68. Tennessee cemented its lead with a shot clock-beating three-point shot with under a minute left by local freshman walk-on Skylar McBee, who entered the rotation due to the suspensions.

Tennessee rode the momentum of the Kansas upset to a 23–7 regular season record. This included another upset of second-ranked Kentucky, which featured future NBA All-Stars John Wall and DeMarcus Cousins, as well as four other eventual NBA players. The Volunteers won 74–65 at home in front of a raucous crowd. The Wildcats were able to avenge the loss a week and half later in the SEC Tournament.

As a no. 6 seed in a bracket featuring overall top seed Kansas, the Volunteers defeated a Steve Fisher-coached San Diego State team with Kawhi Leonard in the first round. No. 14 seed Ohio upset the no. 3 seed Georgetown Hoyas, setting up a matchup between the Volunteers and the Bobcats in the following round. After winning 83–68, Tennessee advanced to Bruce Pearl's third Sweet Sixteen in five years.

In a rematch of the 2007 Sweet Sixteen, the Volunteers faced the Ohio State Buckeyes at the Edward Jones Dome in St. Louis. In a back and forth battle with the Evan Turner-led Buckeyes, Tennessee held a 76–73 lead with 13 seconds left. Turner missed a three-point shot, rebounded his own missed shot, and attempted a final three-point shot that was blocked by J. P. Prince, securing the Volunteers an appearance in the Elite Eight for the first time in program history.

Tennessee faced Michigan State in the Elite Eight. After a fast start, the Vols sputtered in the second half and Michigan State was able to keep the game close. Down by one point with 11 seconds left, Tennessee's Scotty Hopson was set to attempt two free throws. He made the first but missed the second. With the score tied, Michigan State advanced the ball and was fouled on a fast break. Raymar Morgan made one of two free throws, and Michigan State was able to defeat Tennessee one game short of the Final Four.

2010–11

Tennessee opened the 2010–11 season with success, winning the Preseason NIT and rising as high as no. 7 in the national polls. In mid-December, the NCAA announced an investigation into Bruce Pearl for his role in a possible recruiting violation. SEC Commissioner Mike Slive suspended Pearl for the first half of the SEC season. Tennessee faltered throughout the rest of the season to a 19–15 record. Tennessee appeared in the NCAA Tournament for the sixth consecutive year under Pearl and faced Michigan in the opening round. The Volunteers were defeated 75–45 in what proved to be Pearl's last game.

On March 21, 2011, the week after the loss, the university announced the firing of Pearl, based on Pearl's misconduct of lying to the NCAA in the ongoing investigation. Pearl was eventually given a three-year show-cause penalty.

Cuonzo Martin and Donnie Tyndall

On March 27, 2011, the University of Tennessee announced the hiring of Cuonzo Martin as the Volunteers' 18th head coach. Martin had spent the prior three seasons at Missouri State, where he compiled a record of 61–41. Martin was able to lead the Missouri State team from an 11–20 record and a last-place finish in the Missouri Valley Conference to a 26–9 record and a first-place conference finish.

Martin took over a depleted roster with low expectations. After the departure of Tobias Harris following his freshman season, the Volunteers were picked to finish near the bottom of the SEC in 2011–12. With the emergence of Jordan McRae and Jeronne Maymon, and the mid-season addition of Jarnell Stokes, Martin took a team that had lost their top three—and seven of their top ten—contributors from the previous season to a second-place finish in the SEC, largely because of their tough defense and lack of turnovers. With an outside chance at the NCAA Tournament, the Volunteers lost their first SEC tournament game to Ole Miss, ending their NCAA chances. They played in the NIT before losing in the second round.

In 2012–13, the Volunteers started off slowly, posting an 11–10 record before finishing the regular season 8–1. UT was eliminated in the second round of the SEC Tournament and was left out of the NCAA Tournament for the second straight year, finishing as one of the last teams out.

Expectations were high heading into 2013–14 with a roster many felt could compete for a Sweet Sixteen appearance. However, the fans quickly grew vocally upset after another slow start of 16–11. A petition with thousands of signatures surfaced online for the firing of Cuonzo Martin and the re-hiring of Bruce Pearl, whose show-cause order was ending the next year. Whether the petition motivated the team or not, the Volunteers finished the season 5–1 and earned a place in the "First Four" round of the NCAA Tournament. They defeated Iowa in the play-in game in Dayton, OH to move on to face the UMass Minutemen. Martin's Volunteers, who were the lower seed, were favored by many and easily defeated UMass. In one of the biggest upsets in tournament history, Mercer upset Duke, and the Volunteers went on to defeat Mercer to advance to the Sweet Sixteen. Tennessee then played Michigan in Indianapolis. In front of one of the largest crowds to witness a Sweet Sixteen game, the Volunteers' comeback fell short and UT lost to Michigan by a score of 73–71.

Martin resigned from Tennessee and accepted the coaching job at California on April 15, 2014. After a brief coaching search, Tennessee athletics director Dave Hart announced on April 21, 2014 that former Morehead State and Southern Mississippi head coach Donnie Tyndall would become the next head coach of the Tennessee Volunteers.

Tyndall inherited a roster that returned one contributing player from the previous year. Also, due to Jarnell Stokes's decision to enter the NBA draft and two other players transferring, Tyndall had to recruit and sign nearly one-third of the 2015 team's roster in less than a month. Under these circumstances, he led the 2015 team to a 16–16 record.

After the season was over, Tennessee announced it was firing Tyndall with cause after it learned that he had lied to both UT and the NCAA about the severity of major NCAA violations that had occurred at Southern Miss. Hart said that he would have never hired Tyndall had the true extent of the violations been known. By this time, it was clear that Tyndall would face severe penalties for his role in the violations, including a suspension for part of the season. According to ESPN, Hart and other officials were still smarting from Pearl having to sit out the first half of conference play three years earlier, and were not willing to face the prospect of an equally lengthy suspension for Tyndall.

Rick Barnes era
While searching for its third basketball coach in four years, Tennessee sought to make a hire that would bring much-needed stability to the program. During the search process, news broke that Texas had fired their head coach of 17 years, Rick Barnes. Barnes, who had a prior connection to Tennessee athletics director Dave Hart, quickly surfaced as the frontrunner for the job.

On March 31, 2015, Barnes was named the new Tennessee men's basketball coach. Barnes boasts the best record of any coach in school history, with an overall record of 604–314 from his previous tenures at Texas, Clemson, and Providence. Barnes is originally from nearby Hickory, North Carolina, and his wife, Candy, graduated from Tennessee in 1975. The Rick Barnes era began on a winning note as Tennessee defeated UNC-Asheville, 82–78 in Barnes' debut game at UT.

In Barnes' 3rd year as Tennessee's coach he completed quite the turnaround from the previous year's 16-16 (8-10) team, as his team would finish the regular season 26-9 (13-5) and capture a share of the SEC Regular Season Title. This would be Tennessee's first regular-season title since 2008 and tenth overall. Tennessee also reached the SEC Men's Basketball Championship Final where they were defeated by Kentucky 77–72.

In 2019, Tennessee experienced their best season record wise under Barnes. The Volunteers would earn a record of 31-6 (15-3) including an 18-game win streak and a no.1 ranking in the polls for the first time since the 2007–2008 season. The Volunteers again reached the SEC Men's Basketball Championship Final where they were defeated by Auburn 84–64. The Volunteers proceeded to earn a #2 seed in the 2019 NCAA Tournament, where they defeated the Colgate University Raiders 77–70 in the first round. Tennessee overcame a resurgent Iowa Hawkeye team in the second round by a score of 83–77 in an overtime thriller. The Volunteers fell to the Purdue Boilermakers in the Sweet Sixteen in overtime after a thrilling come-from-behind run led by Volunteer Legend Admiral Schofield. Ryan Kline (Purdue) kept the Boilermakers in the game late and after a controversial call on Lamonte Turner, the Vols lost. Junior forward Grant Williams captured the 2018-2019 SEC Player of the year, his second consecutive year obtaining the honor.

Season–by–season results
Source

Facilities

Tennessee plays its home games in Thompson-Boling Arena, which was at one time the largest facility ever built specifically for basketball in the United States, with a seating capacity of 24,678 until its 2007 renovation. Named for the late B. Ray Thompson and former UT President Dr. Edward J. Boling, the arena regularly hosts women's volleyball matches, concerts, camps, conferences, and other special events throughout the year.

Thompson-Boling Arena opened during the 1987–88 season, with Tennessee defeating Marquette 82–56 before a crowd of 25,272. In its opening season, the Volunteers finished third nationally in attendance, with an average attendance of more than 20,000 fans per game. Much of the facility's storied history has centered on men's and women's basketball. In the last two decades, the Volunteers and Lady Volunteers have hosted record college basketball crowds, as well as WNBA and NCAA Tournament basketball games. The Volunteers have ranked fourth in the nation in average home attendance for each of the past three seasons, including an average of 20,483 fans per game in 2008–09. Tennessee's 1989 men's game against Kentucky set the SEC regular-season record with a crowd of 25,610. The Lady Volunteers drew 24,597 fans for their 1998 game with Connecticut to establish a women's NCAA record, while a Celtics-Bullets game in 1988 attracted a then-NBA-record exhibition crowd of 23,611. The arena's largest basketball crowd since its capacity was reduced to 21,678 prior to the 2007–08 season came on January 7, 2009, when the Vols hosted Gonzaga in front of a sellout crowd of 22,326.

UT hosted the NCAA Tournament's South Regional Finals in 1994 and 1999 in the spacious facility, as well as the 1990 NCAA Southeast Region's first and second-round games and the NCAA women's 1990 Final Four. The 1989 SEC Tournament was the first of what promised to be many postseason tournaments to be held in Thompson-Boling Arena. The riverfront arena has drawn rave reviews from teams, administrators, and media for its modern facilities needed for hosting major tournaments.

Postseason

NCAA tournament results
The Volunteers have appeared in the NCAA tournament 25 times. Their combined record is 25–25.

NIT results
The Volunteers have appeared in the National Invitation Tournament (NIT) 13 times. Their combined record is 13–13.

Tennessee's All-Americans

List of retired numbers

Tennessee has retired five jersey numbers.<ref>UTSports,{{cite web |url=http://www.utsports.com/sports/m-baskbl/mtt/dale_ellis_884246.html |title="/>

References

External links